This article summarizes the events, album releases, and album release dates in hip hop music for the year 1981.

Released albums

See also
Last article: 1980 in hip hop music
Next article: 1982 in hip hop music

Hip hop
Hip hop music by year